The 1998 Chicago Marathon was the 21st running of the annual marathon race in Chicago, United States and was held on October 11. The elite men's race was won by Kenya's Ondoro Osoro in a time of 2:06:54 hours and the women's race was won in 2:23:57 by Joyce Chepchumba, also of Kenya.

Results

Men

Women

References

Results. Association of Road Racing Statisticians. Retrieved 2020-04-10.

External links 
 Official website

Chicago Marathon
Chicago
1990s in Chicago
1998 in Illinois
Chicago Marathon
Chicago Marathon